The AVR reactor was a prototype pebble-bed reactor, located immediately adjacent to Jülich Research Centre in West Germany, constructed in 1960, grid connected in 1967 and shut down in 1988. It was a 15 MWe, 46 MWt test reactor used to develop and test a variety of fuels and machinery.

The AVR was based on the concept of a "Daniels pile" by Farrington Daniels, the inventor of pebble bed reactors. Rudolf Schulten is commonly recognized as the intellectual father of the reactor.

A consortium of 15 community electric companies owned and operated the plant. Over its lifetime the reactor had many accidents, earning it the name "shipwreck."  From 2011 to 2014, outside experts examined the historical operations and operational hazards and described serious concealed problems and wrongdoings in their final 2014 report. For example, in 1978 operators bypassed reactor shutdown controls to delay an emergency shutdown during an accident for six days. In 2014 the JRC and AVR publicly admitted to failures.

Its decommissioning has been exceptionally difficult, time-consuming and expensive. Since the original operators were overwhelmed by the effort, government agencies took over dismantling and disposal. In 2003 the reactor and its nuclear waste became government property. The temporary storage of 152 casks of spent fuel has been a controversy since 2009.  The approval expired in 2013, because stress tests could not sufficiently demonstrate safety; no permanent solution has been reached. Since 2012 plans to export the casks to the United States have been considered due to the extremely high disposal expenses. In 2014, a massive concrete wall to protect against terrorist plane crashes was to be built.  On July 2, 2014, the Federal Environment ministry issued an evacuation order for the temporary storage.

AVR was the basis of the technology licensed to China to build HTR-10 and the HTR-PM, which became operational in 2021.

History 
In 1959, 15 municipal electric companies established the "Association of Experimental Reactor GmbH" (AVR Ltd) to demonstrate the feasibility and viability of a gas-cooled, graphite-moderated high temperature reactor. In 1961, BBC and Krupp began AVR construction, led by Rudolf Schulten, performed on almost purely industrial basis until 1964. The federal government provided financial assistance, supported by the politician and founder of the Jülich Research Center (JRC), Leo Brandt.
In 1964, Schulten became Director of the JRC and started to devote more attention to the pebble bed reactor. In 1966, AVR first achieved criticality, and was connected to the national power grid in 1967. Construction cost figures vary between 85 and 125 million Deutsche marks ($2.5–3.7bn in 2014).
Since about 1970 the AVR GmbH was de facto dependent on JRC, although it remained formally independent until 2003. JRC provided generous operating grants to the AVR GmbH to ensure continued operation, since electricity generation only covered a small part of the operating costs. In the mid-1970s annual revenue was about 3 million DM, versus operating and fuel disposal costs of 11 million DM. JRC also subsidized AVR through procurement and disposal of fuel as JRC has been owner of AVR fuel. In addition, the AVR operation was scientifically supervised by JRC.

Fuels tested 
From 1974 to 1978, mainly carbide BISO fuel was in the core. From 1983 to 1988, oxide fuel with TRISO particles was used.

Higher temperatures 
In February 1974, the cooling gas outlet temperature was raised to 950 °C. These final high temperatures were a world record for nuclear facilities, though later exceeded by the US test reactor UHTREX. Such high temperatures were supposed to demonstrate the suitability of the AVR for coal gasification, and thus contribute to long-term plans for coal in Northrhine-Westfalia.
Because a pebble bed core cannot be equipped with instruments, the high AVR core temperatures were unknown until one year before the AVR shut-down, in 1988.

Design 
The core held about 100,000 fuel element pebbles. On average each would take 6 to 8 months to pass through the core.
Helium flowed up through the core of pebbles.

Contamination, internal and external
AVR's helium outlet temperature was 950 °C, but fuel temperature instabilities occurred during operation with localised exceedingly high temperatures. Concerning beta-contamination AVR is the highest contaminated nuclear installation worldwide as AVR management confirmed 2001.

Thus in 2008, the reactor vessel was filled with light concrete to fixate the radioactive fine particle dust. In 2012, the reactor vessel of 2100 metric tons was to be transported about 200 meters by air-cushion sled and seven cranes to an intermediate storage site.

During a severe water accident in 1978,  leaked, and in 1999 soil and groundwater contamination below the reactor was discovered, as confirmed by the German government in February 2010.

Decommissioning

Fuel removal out of AVR was difficult and lasted four years. During this time it became obvious that the AVR bottom reflector was broken; about 200 fuel pebbles remain wedged in its crack. Currently no dismantling method for the AVR vessel exists. It is planned to develop some procedure during the next 60 years and to start with vessel dismantling at the end of the 21st century. After the AVR vessel is moved into intermediate storage, the reactor buildings will be dismantled, and soil and groundwater will be decontaminated.  Costs from 1988 to present are €700 million. The total AVR decommissioning costs are expected to be in the order of  €1.5 to 2.5 billion, all public funds, i.e. to exceed its construction costs by far.

Independent expert review report, 2014
From 2011 to 2014, outside experts examined the historical operations and operational hazards and in April 2014, published a report on the AVR operation. The report listed hidden or downplayed events and accidents and described serious concealed problems and wrongdoings. For example, in 1978 operators bypassed reactor shutdown controls to delay an emergency shutdown during an accident for six days. In 2014 the JRC and AVR publicly admitted to failures and issued a regret about its failures and scientific misconduct with respect to the AVR.

See also

 Skyshine
 Thorium High Temperature Reactor

References

External links
 Jülich Research Centre.
 The Pebble Bed Evolution June 2005 (PDF, 17KB).

   

Pebble bed reactors
Former nuclear power stations in Germany
Radioactively contaminated areas